Dalbergia melanoxylon (African blackwood, grenadilla, or mpingo) is a flowering plant in the family Fabaceae, native to seasonally dry regions of Africa from Senegal east to Eritrea and south to the north-eastern parts of South Africa. The tree is an important timber species in its native areas; it is used in the manufacture of musical instruments and fine furniture. Populations and genomic resources for genetic biodiversity maintenance in parts of its native range are threatened by overharvesting due to poor or absent conservation planning and by the species' low germination rates.

It is a small tree, reaching 4–15 m tall, with grey bark and spiny shoots. The leaves are deciduous in the dry season, alternate, 6–22 cm long, pinnately compound, with 6–9 alternately arranged leaflets. The flowers are white and produced in dense clusters. The fruit is a pod 3–7 cm long, containing one to two seeds.

Uses

The dense, lustrous wood ranges in colour from reddish to pure black. It is generally cut into small billets or logs with its sharply demarcated bright yellow-white sapwood left on to assist in the slow drying so as to prevent cracks developing. Good quality  "A" grade African blackwood commands high prices on the commercial timber market. The timber is used mainly because of its machinability, density, dimensional stability, and moisture repellence. Those properties are particularly valued when used in woodwind instruments, principally clarinets, oboes, transverse flutes, piccolos, recorders, Highland pipes, and Northumbrian pipes. The Deering Banjo Company uses blackwood ("grenadilla") to construct the tone ring in its John Hartford-model banjo because it weighs less than brass or bronze tone rings, and that the wood "plays in" (improves in tone) with use. Furniture makers from ancient Egypt on have valued this timber. A story states that it has even been used as ballast in trading ships and that some enterprising Northumbrian pipe makers used old discarded blackwood ballast to great effect. The German knife companies Wüsthof, Böker and J. A. Henckels sell knives with blackwood handles due to the wood's moisture repellent qualities.

Due to overuse, the mpingo tree is severely threatened in Kenya and is needing attention in Tanzania and Mozambique.  The trees are being harvested at an unsustainable rate, partly because of illegal smuggling of the wood into Kenya, but also because the tree takes upwards of 60 years to mature.

Relation to other woods
 African blackwood is no longer regarded as ebony, a name now reserved for a limited number of timbers yielded by the genus Diospyros; these are more of a matte appearance and are more brittle.
 The genus Dalbergia yields other famous timbers such as Brazilian rosewood (Dalbergia nigra), Dalbergia cearensis and cocobolo (Dalbergia retusa).

Names
Other names by which the tree is known include babanus and grenadilla, which appear as loanwords in various local English dialects.

Conservation
There are multiple organisations involved in the conservation of African blackwood: the Mpingo Conservation & Development Initiative, the African Blackwood Conservation Project, and Clarinets for Conservation.

The Mpingo Conservation & Development Initiative (MCDI, formerly the Mpingo Conservation Project) is involved in research, awareness raising and practical conservation of African blackwood. Conservation of Mpingo and its natural habitat can be achieved by ensuring that local people living in mpingo harvesting areas receive a fair share of the revenue created, thus providing them with an incentive to manage the habitat in an environmentally friendly manner. In order to achieve this, the MCDI is helping communities to get Forest Stewardship Certification.

The African blackwood Conservation Project works around Mount Kilimanjaro replanting African blackwood trees, and in conservation education. It also works with adult and women's groups in the promotion of environmentally sound land uses.

Clarinets for Conservation is based in Moshi, Tanzania and aims to raise awareness and promote conservation of Mpingo through music education. Students participate in an interdisciplinary program during the summer months that raises awareness of the value of Mpingo through musical performances, classroom instruction, and tree plantings at local secondary and primary schools.

Small growers in Naples, Florida have been successful in growing African blackwood there. Growth habit in Florida yields taller, larger trees, and the rich soil combined with ample nutrients and long growing season yields timber of superior quality at more sustainable rates.

Footnotes

References and external links
 
ARKive - images and movies of the African blackwood (Dalbergia melanoxylon)
Tanzania: Protecting the World's Most Expensive Tree
FAO factsheet
Winrock Forestry factsheet
Global Trees factsheet
Mpingo conservation
Sustainable Blackwood - the Sound and Fair campaign
Some facts about the wood
ENVIRONMENT-TANZANIA: Protecting the World's Most Expensive Tree

melanoxylon
Trees of Africa
Near threatened plants
Wood